This is a list of U.S. state senators.

Summary

Superlatives 

From the 50 state legislatures in the United States, the following superlatives emerge:

 Largest legislature: New Hampshire General Court (424 members)

 Smallest legislature: Nebraska Legislature (49 members)

 Largest upper house: Minnesota Senate (67 senators)

 Smallest upper house: Alaska Senate (20 senators)

 Largest lower house: New Hampshire House of Representatives (400 representatives)

 Smallest lower house: Alaska House of Representatives (40 representatives)

There are a total of 1,972 state senators nationwide, with the average state senate having 39 members.

Alabama

Alaska

Arizona

Arkansas

California

Colorado

Connecticut

Delaware

Florida

Georgia

Hawaii

Idaho

Illinois

Indiana

Iowa

Kansas

Kentucky

Louisiana

Maine

Maryland

Massachusetts

Michigan

Minnesota

Mississippi

Missouri

Montana

Nevada

Nebraska 

Nebraska has a unicameral legislature.

New Hampshire

New Jersey

New Mexico

New York

North Carolina

North Dakota

Ohio

Oklahoma

Oregon

Pennsylvania

Rhode Island

South Carolina

South Dakota

Tennessee

Texas

Utah

Vermont

Virginia

Washington

West Virginia

Wisconsin

Wyoming

See also 

 List of United States state legislatures
 List of U.S. state representatives (Alabama to Missouri)
 List of U.S. state representatives (Montana to Wyoming)

Reference

External links 

 

Legislatures-related lists
Senators
Senators